Masters of the Universe: The Movie is an action-adventure game developed by Gremlin Graphics, and published in 1987. It is based on the American film Masters of the Universe (1987), directed by Gary Goddard. The film and the game are part of the Masters of the Universe media franchise.

A promotional photo of Dolph Lundgren as He-Man and Frank Langella as Skeletor illustrates the video game packaging. The MSX version of the game is titled Masters of the Universe.

Two other Masters of the Universe video games were published in the same year: Masters of the Universe: The Arcade Game and Masters of the Universe: The Super Adventure.

See also
 1987 in video gaming

References

External links
 

1987 video games
Masters of the Universe video games
Video games based on films
Amstrad CPC games
Commodore 64 games
MSX games
Video games developed in the United Kingdom
Video games set on fictional planets
ZX Spectrum games